Four Saxophones in Twelve Tones is an album by composer/arranger Lyle Murphy recorded in 1954 and released on the GNP label. This was the first recording utilizing Murphy's own 12-tone system of composition.

Track listing
 "Tone Poem" (Lyle Murphy)
 "I Only Have Eyes for You" (Harry Warren, Al Dubin)
 "Frantastic" (Murphy)
 "Caleta" (Murphy, Eddie Laguna)
 "Lost in Fugue" (Murphy)
 "Frankly Speaking" (Murphy)
 "Illusion" (Murphy)
 "Crazy Quilt" (Murphy)

Personnel
Frank Morgan - alto saxophone (soloist)
Russ Cheever - soprano saxophone
Benny Carter - alto saxophone
Buddy Collette - tenor saxophone
Bob Gordon - baritone saxophone
Lyle Murphy - celeste
Buddy Clark - bass
Chico Hamilton (tracks 1-4) and Richie Frost (tracks 5-8) - drums

References

External links
 

1955 albums